19 Lyrae is a single variable star located approximately 950 light years away from the Sun in the northern constellation of Lyra. It has the variable star designation V471 Lyr, while 19 Lyrae is the Flamsteed designation. This object is just bright enough to be visible to the naked eye, appearing as a dim, blue-white star with a baseline apparent visual magnitude of 5.93. It is moving closer to the Earth with a heliocentric radial velocity of −30 km/s, and may come as close as  around 8.5 million years from now.

The light variations of this star were discovered by J. E. Winzer in 1974. It is an Alpha2 Canum Venaticorum-type variable with a period of 1.160898 days (or 7.0980 days), ranging in magnitude from a high of 5.91 down to 5.98. The surface magnetic field has a strength of 

19 Lyrae has a moderate rotation rate, showing a projected rotational velocity of 35 km/s. Stellar models give it an estimated 3.8 times the mass of the Sun and its girth is measured at 6.4 times the Sun's radius.

References 

B-type giants
Alpha2 Canum Venaticorum variables
Ap stars

Lyra (constellation)
7283
Durchmusterung objects
Lyrae, 19
179527
094311
Lyrae, V471